Conchomyces is a genus of fungi in the family Tricholomataceae. The genus was named and described scientifically by Casper van Overeem in 1927. The genus contains two species found in Indonesia.

See also

List of Tricholomataceae genera

References

External links

Tricholomataceae
Agaricales genera